Linophryne macrodon is a species of bearded seadevils in the family Linophrynidae, that live in waters 300 to 1000 m (980 to 3280 ft) deep in the Eastern Central Pacific Ocean.

Description
Females grow up to 9.1 cm in length, and have a single distal branched filament, that is half the diameter of the bulb. It has three branches along each side of the bulb, that can be 3 times the diameter of the bulb, and have subdermal pigment on the caudal peduncle. Males are smaller, at only 2.2 cm in length, and have pointed sphenotic spines. The eggs of L. macrodon are only 1 mm in diameter.

Specimens
All the specimens of L. macrodon have been caught from non-closing nets, from depths to 1000 m (3280 ft), but one that was 44 mm was taken at only 300 m (980 ft) deep from a bottom haul in the mesopelagic zone.

References

Fish described in 1925
Linophrynidae